Haywood Cozart (April 17, 1917 – May 21, 1989), nicknamed "Big Train", was an American Negro league pitcher. 

A native of Raleigh, North Carolina, Cozart made his Negro leagues debut in 1939 with the Newark Eagles, and played again for Newark in 1944. He died in Detroit, Michigan in 1989 at age 72.

References

External links
 and Seamheads

1917 births
1989 deaths
Newark Eagles players
Baseball pitchers
Baseball players from Raleigh, North Carolina